Hastings Island is located off the south coast of Western Australia near Esperance and Cape Le Grand National Park.

References

Islands of Goldfields-Esperance